Ari Anjala (born 31 May 1958) is a Finnish orienteering competitor, three times medalist in the relay at the World Orienteering Championships.

He received a silver medal in the relay event in 1979, a bronze medal in 1981, and a bronze medal in 1991.

Anjala and orienteer Outi Borgenström have a son, Topi Anjala, who is also an orienteer.

See also
 Finnish orienteers
 List of orienteers
 List of orienteering events

References

1958 births
Living people
Finnish orienteers
Male orienteers
Foot orienteers
World Orienteering Championships medalists